Zhiryan (also Romanized as Zhīryān, Zhīrayān, Zhīrīān, Zhīzīān, Zīrīān, and Zīryān; also known as Jīrīān Gargar) is a village in Firuzabad Rural District, Firuzabad District, Selseleh County, Lorestan Province, Iran. At the 2006 census, its population was 244, in 48 families.

References 

Towns and villages in Selseleh County